Trypocopris vernalis, (previously listed under the Geotrupes genus as Geotrupes vernalis) known sometimes by the common name spring dumbledor or spring dor beetle, is a type of dung beetle. The larva of Trypocopris vernalis feeds on dung of animals such as sheep (Ovis aries) and red foxes (Vulpes vulpes).

Distribution
Trypocopris vernalis is found in Europe and Asia Minor. Trypocopris vernalis are considered a super-dominant or dominant species of earth-boring dung beetles depending on the season, being most prevalent during the spring and early summer, with rare sightings in the autumn. According to Hülsmann et al., Trypocopris vernalis prefers open or semi-open areas and young woodlands.

References
Sources
 
Citations

External links 
 

Beetles described in 1758
Taxa named by Carl Linnaeus
Geotrupidae